Huk (also Romanized as Hūk) is a village in Kahruyeh Rural District, in the Central District of Shahreza County, Isfahan Province, Iran. At the 2006 census, its population was 133, in 28 families.

References 

Populated places in Shahreza County